WYVE is a Full Service-formatted broadcast radio station licensed to Wytheville, Virginia, serving Wytheville and Wythe County, Virginia. WYVE is owned and operated by Three Rivers Media Corporation.

References

External links
 True Country 1280 WYVE Online

YVE
Country radio stations in the United States
Radio stations established in 1949
1949 establishments in Virginia
Full service radio stations in the United States